Odozana obscura is a moth of the subfamily Arctiinae. It was described by Schaus in 1896. It is found in Rio de Janeiro, Brazil.

References

Lithosiini
Moths described in 1896